Katherine Dieckmann is an American film and music video director known for her work with R.E.M. and the feature films Good Baby and Diggers.

Music video filmography
"Shiny Happy People" by R.E.M.
"Stand" by R.E.M.
"Your Ghost" by Kristin Hersh
"Jupiter 4" by Sharon Van Etten

She is also known for having directed the cult children's television series The Adventures of Pete & Pete.

Feature filmography
Good Baby (2000)
Diggers (2006)
Motherhood (2009)
Strange Weather (2016)

References

External links
 

Living people
American film directors
American women film directors
American music video directors
Vassar College alumni
Year of birth missing (living people)
21st-century American women